The following is a list of notable events and releases of the year 1890 in Norwegian music.

Events

Deaths

 January
 29 – Johan Didrik Behrens,  (born 1820).

Births

 April
 4 – Per Kvist, revue writer, entertainer, stage actor, film actor and children's writer (died 1947).

 August
 5 – Pauline Hall, writer, music critic, and composer (died 1969).

 September
 8 – Bjørn Talén, operatic tenor (died 1945).
 11 – Marius Ulfrstad, composer, organist and music teacher (died 1968).

 October
 1 – Gunnar Kjeldaas, composer and organist (died 1963).

See also
 1890 in Norway
 Music of Norway

References

 
Norwegian music
Music
1890s in Norwegian music